Continental Micronesia flew to the following airports.

On December 22, 2010, Continental Micronesia's operating certificate was merged into Continental's, all Continental Micronesia flights became branded as Continental flights.

Asia

East Asia
 
 Kai Tak Airport (terminated due to airport closure)
 Hong Kong International Airport
 
 Fukuoka - Fukuoka Airport
 Hiroshima - Hiroshima Airport
 Nagoya
 Nagoya Komaki Airport
 Chubu Centrair International Airport
 Niigata - Niigata Airport
 Okayama - Okayama Airport
 Okinawa - Naha Airport
 Osaka
 Itami Airport
 Kansai International Airport
 Sapporo - New Chitose Airport
 Sendai - Sendai Airport
 Tokyo - Narita International Airport
 
 Seoul - Gimpo International Airport
 
 Kaohsiung - Kaohsiung International Airport
 Taipei – Taoyuan International Airport

Southeast Asia
 
 Denpasar - Ngurah Rai International Airport
 
 Cebu - Mactan–Cebu International Airport
 Manila - Ninoy Aquino International Airport

North America
 
 Hilo - Hilo International Airport
 Honolulu - Daniel K. Inouye International Airport

Oceania
 
 Brisbane - Brisbane Airport
 Cairns - Cairns Airport
 Melbourne - Melbourne Airport
 Sydney - Sydney Airport
 
 Chuuk - Chuuk International Airport
 Kosrae - Kosrae International Airport
 Pohnpei - Pohnpei International Airport
 Yap - Yap International Airport
 
 Nadi - Nadi International Airport
 
Papeete – Faa'a International Airport
 
 Antonio B. Won Pat International Airport - Main Hub
 
 
 
 Kwajalein - Bucholz Army Airfield
 Majuro - Marshall Islands International Airport
 
 Auckland – Auckland Airport
 
 Koror - Palau International Airport
 
 Port Moresby - Jacksons International Airport
 
 Nouméa - La Tontouta International Airport
 
 Rota - Rota International Airport

References

Continental Airlines
Continental Micronesia
Lists of airline destinations